The 2003 Uttlesford District Council election took place on 1 May 2003 to elect members of Uttlesford District Council in England. This was on the same day as other local elections.

Summary

|}

References

Uttlesford
Uttlesford District Council elections
2000s in Essex